Marian Jacek Woszczerowicz (1904–1970) was a Polish actor.

Selected filmography
 Znachor (1937)
 Rena (1938)
 Profesor Wilczur (1938)
 Klamstwo Krystyny (1939)
 Zemsta (1957)

Bibliography
 Skaff, Sheila. The Law of the Looking Glass: Cinema in Poland, 1896-1939. Ohio University Press, 2008.

External links

1904 births
1970 deaths
People from Siedlce
People from Siedlce Governorate
Polish male film actors
20th-century Polish male actors
Artists from Białystok
Recipients of the State Award Badge (Poland)